College of Nursing is a nursing college located near Raj Bhavan in Hyderabad. It is a notified heritage structure in Hyderabad. The newly elected Telangana government led by its Chief Minister K Chandrashekar Rao has planned to demolish the structure and build high rises in its place.

Previously it was known as Hyderabad Civil Service House and accommodated the offices for the top civil servants of then Hyderabad State known until 1948 as Hyderabad Civil Service.  After its merger with India, in 1950 this building was converted into College of Nursing.

References

Universities and colleges in Hyderabad, India
Heritage structures in Hyderabad, India
Nursing schools in India
1950 establishments in India
Educational institutions established in 1950